Gashur-e Qaleh Mohammad (also Romanized as Gashūr-e Qal‘eh Moḩammad; also known as Qal‘eh Moḩammad, Kalām-i- Ahmad, Keshvar Qal‘eh Moḩammad, Qal‘eh-ye Moḩammad, and Qolā Moḩammad) is a village in Kakavand-e Sharqi Rural District, Kakavand District, Delfan County, Lorestan Province, Iran. At the 2006 census, its population was 49, in 11 families.

References 

Towns and villages in Delfan County